"Maps" is a song by Irish singer Lesley Roy. The song represented Ireland in the Eurovision Song Contest 2021 in Rotterdam, the Netherlands.

Eurovision Song Contest

Internal selection 
On 17 December 2020, Irish national broadcaster RTÉ confirmed that Lesley Roy would represent Ireland in the 2021 contest. The song was premiered on The RTÉ 2fm Breakfast Show on 26 February 2021.

The same day, a music video was released for the song, filmed by Ais Brady in the Wicklow Mountains. They performed the song live for the first time on The Late Late Show that evening.

At Eurovision 
The 65th edition of the Eurovision Song Contest took place in Rotterdam, the Netherlands and consisted of two semi-finals on 18 May and 20 May 2021, and the grand final on 22 May 2021. On 17 November 2020, it was announced that Ireland would be performing in the first half of the first semi-final of the contest.

Charts

References 

2021 songs
2021 singles
Eurovision songs of 2021
Eurovision songs of Ireland
Lesley Roy songs
Universal Music Group singles
Songs written by Lukas Hällgren